Haldane of the Secret Service is a 1923 American silent adventure film directed by Harry Houdini. The film stars Harry Houdini, Gladys Leslie, William J. Humphrey, Richard Carlyle, Edward Boulden, Jane Jennings, and Charles Fang. The film was released on September 30, 1923, by Film Booking Offices of America.

Plot
"Heath Haldane (Houdini), son of a detective slain by a gang of counterfeiters, swears vengeance. He rescues a girl (Leslie) from the gang, but is thrown into river by them for dead, and escapes.

"He rounds them up after many adventures, brings about their arrest, and discovers the leader of the gang is father of girl whom he loves." -- Motion Picture News Booking Guide (April 1924)

Cast
Harry Houdini as Heath Haldane 
Gladys Leslie as Adele Ormsby
William J. Humphrey as Edward Ormsby 
Richard Carlyle as Joe Ivors
Edward Boulden as Raoul Usher
Jane Jennings as Mrs. Clive Usher
Charles Fang as Ah Ling 
Myrtle Morse as Andrea Drayton
Irving Brooks as Bruce Drayton

References

External links

1923 films
American adventure films
1923 adventure films
Harry Houdini
American black-and-white films
American silent feature films
Film Booking Offices of America films
1920s English-language films
1920s American films
Silent adventure films